Boorowa Council was a local government area in the South West Slopes region of New South Wales, Australia. The LGA was located adjacent to the Lachlan Valley Way and included Boorowa and the small towns of Rye Park, Rugby, Frogmore and Reids Flat. Burrowa LGA was formed on 1 September 1944 through the amalgamation of Murrungal Shire and the Municipality of Burrowa.

On 12 May 2016, the Boorowa Council was abolished and merged with the Harden and Young shires to establish the Hilltops Council.

The last mayor of Boorowa Council was Cr. Wendy Tuckerman, an independent politician.

Council

Composition and election method
Boorowa Council was composed of nine councillors elected proportionally as one entire ward. All councillors were elected for a fixed four-year term of office. The mayor was elected by the councillors at the first meeting of the council. The last election was held on 8 September 2012, and the makeup of the council was as follows:

The final Council, elected in 2012, in order of election, was:

Amalgamation 
A 2015 review of local government boundaries recommended that Boorowa Council merge with adjoining councils. The NSW Government considered two proposals. Following the lodging of an alternate proposal by Harden Shire on 28 February 2016 to amalgamate the Cootamundra, Gundagai and Harden shires, the NSW Minister for Local Government proposed a merger between Boorowa Council and Young shire. Boorowa Council was abolished on 12 May 2016 and along with Harden Shire and Young Shire, the area was included in the new Hilltops Council local government area.

References

Former local government areas of New South Wales
1944 establishments in Australia
2016 disestablishments in Australia